Isis Lock (known to boatmen as "Louse Lock") is a lock connecting the Oxford Canal and the Castle Mill Stream, a backwater of the River Thames in Oxford, England.

Location
The Isis Lock is close to Sheepwash Channel, just to the south and linking with the River Thames to the west. To the west of the lock are Rewley Road, the Cherwell Valley Line, and the Cotswold Line, just north of Oxford railway station. To the east over the Oxford Canal are the grounds of Worcester College, one of the colleges of Oxford University.

There is a winding hole for boats to turn on the Oxford Canal just to the north of the lock.

History
In central Oxford, the Oxford Canal and the River Thames were originally linked by a flash lock at Hythe Bridge. In 1795–97, David Harris replaced it with Isis Lock, a broad lock to allow Thames barges in and out of the Oxford Canal Company's Worcester Street wharves. Isis Lock was rebuilt as a narrow lock in 1844.

Gallery

References

Sources

1797 establishments in England
Transport infrastructure completed in 1797
Transport infrastructure completed in 1844
Locks of Oxfordshire
Buildings and structures in Oxford
Transport in Oxford
Oxford Canal